Greg Herren is an American writer and editor, who publishes work in a variety of genres, including mystery novels, young adult literature and erotica. He publishes work both as Greg Herren and under the pseudonym Todd Gregory.

His novel Murder in the Rue Chartres won a Lambda Literary Award in the Gay Mystery category at the 2008 Lambda Literary Awards, and his anthology Love, Bourbon Street: Reflections of New Orleans, co-edited with Paul J. Willis, won in the anthologies category at the 2007 Lambda Literary Awards.

He was also nominated in the mystery category in 2003 for Murder in the Rue Dauphine, in 2004 for Bourbon Street Blues in 2005 for Jackson Square Jazz, in 2007 for Mardi Gras Mambo, in 2010 for Murder in the Garden District and in 2011 for Vieux Carré Voodoo, in the anthologies category in 2005 for Shadows of the Night: Queer Tales of the Uncanny and Unusual and in the science fiction, fantasy and horror category in 2013 for the anthology Night Shadows: Queer Horror, co-edited with J.M. Redmann. As Todd Gregory, he was also nominated in the Gay Erotica category in 2010 for the anthology Rough Trade: Dangerous Gay Erotica and in 2013 for the anthology Raising Hell: Demonic Gay Erotica.

Openly gay, Herren lives in New Orleans, Louisiana, where he also works as an HIV/AIDS counselor and educator. He was also a co-founder of the Saints and Sinners Literary Festival.

In 2005, he was barred from a planned speaking engagement to the gay-straight alliance at Manchester High School in Midlothian, Virginia due to his erotic writing, and was defended by the American Civil Liberties Union.

Awards

Novels

Scotty Bradley Mysteries
Bourbon Street Blues (2004)
Jackson Square Jazz (2005)
Mardi Gras Mambo (2006)
Vieux Carré Voodoo (2010)
Who Dat Whodunnit (2011)
Baton Rouge Bingo (2013)
Garden District Gothic (2016)
Royal Street Reveillon (2019)

Chanse MacLeod Mysteries
Murder in the Rue Dauphine (2002)
Murder in the Rue St. Ann (2004)
Murder in the Rue Chartres (2007)
Murder in the Rue Ursulines (2008)
Murder in the Garden District (2009)
Murder in the Irish Channel (2011)
Murder in the Arts District (2014)

Other novels
Sorceress (2010)
Sleeping Angel (2011)
Sara (2012)
Timothy (2012)
Fashion Victim (2012, e-book)
Lake Thirteen (2013)

Anthologies
Shadows of the Night: Queer Tales of the Uncanny and Unusual (2004)
Midnight Thirsts: Erotic Tales of the Vampire (2004)
Love, Bourbon Street: A Celebration of New Orleans (2006)
Men of the Mean Streets: Gay Noir (2011)
Women of the Mean Streets: Lesbian Noir (2011)
Night Shadows: Queer Horror (2012)

Erotica (as Todd Gregory)
Every Frat Boy Wants It (2007)
Rough Trade: Dangerous Gay Erotica (2009)
Midnight Hunger: Erotic Tales of the Vampire (2009)
Blood Sacraments (2010)
Games Frat Boys Play (2011)
Wings: Subversive Gay Angel Erotica (2011)
Need (2012)
Sweat: Gay Jock Erotica (2012)
Raising Hell: Demonic Gay Erotica (2012)
Promises in Every Star (2013)

References

External links

American male novelists
21st-century American novelists
American mystery writers
American young adult novelists
American erotica writers
American gay writers
Lambda Literary Award winners
Writers from New Orleans
Living people
American LGBT novelists
American male short story writers
21st-century American short story writers
21st-century American male writers
Novelists from Louisiana
LGBT people from Louisiana
Anthony Award winners
1961 births